James Douglas Martin (September 1, 1918 – October 30, 2017) was an American politician. 

Martin was born in Tarrant, Alabama. He served as a member for the 7th district of Alabama of the United States House of Representatives from 1965 to 1967. Martin died in October 2017 at his home in Gadsden, Alabama, at the age of 99.

References

External links
James Douglas Martin 
The Political Graveyard

|-

|-

|-

1918 births
2017 deaths
People from Jefferson County, Alabama
Alabama Democrats
Alabama Republicans
Members of the United States House of Representatives from Alabama
American energy industry businesspeople
United States Army personnel of World War II
United States Army officers
Military personnel from Alabama
Politicians from Gadsden, Alabama
Birmingham School of Law alumni
Republican Party members of the United States House of Representatives
American United Methodists
20th-century Methodists
21st-century Methodists
20th-century American politicians